Two anime series based on the Record of Lodoss War novels and role playing games have been released in Japan in various forms. The first series, a 13 episode original video animation (OVA) produced by Madhouse Studios, was released in VHS format from June 30, 1990, through November 20, 1991. In 1998, AIC produced a 27-episode anime television series that continued the story of the first OVA series, but ignored its last third in order to adapt the original novel series more faithfully. Record of Lodoss War: Chronicles of the Heroic Knight premiered on TV Tokyo on April 1, 1998, and ran until its conclusion on September 30, 1998. A theatrical short, Welcome to Lodoss Island was released on April 25, 1998. Directed by Kōichi Chigira, the short features a series of comedy skits.

Both Record of Lodoss War and Record of Lodoss War: Chronicles of the Heroic Knight were licensed for an English language release in North America by Central Park Media.

Episode list

Record of Lodoss War (1990)

Record of Lodoss War: Chronicles of the Heroic Knight (1998)

References

Episodes
Record of Lodoss War